Shines is a surname. Notable people with the surname include:

Johnny Shines (1915–1992), American musician
Razor Shines (born 1956), American baseball player

See also
Shine (disambiguation)